John De Buck (born 9 May 1992), known professionally as Apashe (pronounced 'A-pa-she'), is a Belgian-born Canadian musician. He was born in Brussels, Belgium and currently lives in Montreal, Canada.

Life and career
Apashe was born in Brussels. At the age of 19 he moved to Canada. There he began studying electroacoustics at Concordia University and then stayed in Montreal. After his studies he worked as a sound designer at Apollo Studio, where he co-produced the sound design for video games (e.g. Assassin's Creed, Watch Dogs, Far Cry) and the sound for Ubisoft gaming trailers. In 2014 he left the company as his own music started to kick off. 2011 he was signed by Kannibalen Records. In 2020 he released his second album Renaissance – a mix of electronic and classical music. For this project the Prague Symphony Orchestra with 69 instruments was hired. Requiem, which won GAMIQ's Electronic EP of the Year, and Renaissance were produced in his first own studio. His music has been used in various movie and series trailers e.g. John Wick, Marvel's Iron Fist, Kingsman: The Golden Circle, Fast & Furious, and Love, Death & Robots Volume 3.

Apashe describes his music as "majestic" (a mix of classical and electronic music). When Apashe composes, he takes inspiration from movie scenes that he creates in his head, while still aiming to make his music danceable. He has collaborated with Tech N9ne, Alina Pash, Dabin, Sway, Black Prez, Wasiu, Lubalin, wifisfuneral, RIOT, Vladimir Cauchemar and more.

Discography

Albums 
 Renaissance (2020)

Singles and EPs 

 Black Mythology EP (2013)
 Golden Empire (2014)
 Goodbye (2014)
 No Twerk (2014)
 Battle Royale (2014)
 Confess (2015)
 I'm A Dragon (2015)
 Trap Requiem (2015)
 No Twerk VIP (2015)
 Tank Girls (2015)
 Skeleton Dance (2016)
 Fire Inside (2016)
 Copter Boy (2016)
 Supernova (2017)
 Do It (2018)
 Feeling Good (2018)
 Requiem (2018)
 Requiem Remix EP (2018)
 The Good, The Bad & The Fake (2019)
 Annihilation (2019)
 Renaissance (Remixes) (2021)
 I Killed the Orchestra EP (2021)
 RIP (2022)
 I Killed the Orchestra Remix EP (2022)

Music videos 
Apashe worked with director, cinematographer and friend Adrian Villagomez on the music videos for the songs "RIP", "Lord & Master", "Uebok" and many more. 
3D-Artist and motion designer Josué Zabeau created a lot of the visual effects for his music videos and visuals for his live shows.

Awards 
Berlin Music Video Awards

GAMIQQ

References 

1992 births
Living people
Canadian electronic musicians
Musicians from Montreal